Media outlets in the Augusta, Georgia (United States) market include eight television stations, 24 FM radio stations, nine AM radio stations, one Internet radio station and numerous print media.

Television

All broadcast television stations are licensed to Augusta unless otherwise noted:

Radio

FM radio stations
Stations broadcasting on the FM frequency:

AM radio stations
Stations broadcasting on the AM frequency:

Internet radio station
Stations broadcasting solely on the Internet:

Print media

Local newspapers based in Augusta:

See also

Arts and culture in Augusta, Georgia
 Georgia media
 Media of cities in Georgia: Athens, Atlanta, Columbus, Macon, Savannah

References

External links
 

Augusta